The Ministry of Defense is the cabinet ministry of Afghanistan responsible for overseeing the country's military (currently the Islamic Emirate Armed Forces). The ministry's headquarters is located in Kabul.

List of ministers

The Islamic Republic period
During the Islamic Republic of Afghanistan (2004–2021), the defense minister was nominated by the President of Afghanistan and the National Assembly made the final approval.

One of the functions of the Defense Ministry during that period was the continuance of disarming insurgent groups, through programmes such as the Afghan New Beginnings Programme (which included the rehabilitation and reintegration of child soldiers). These militant groups coalesced from warlords and former army personnel after the collapse of the Najibullah government in 1992.

Notes

See also
 Ministry of Interior Affairs (Afghanistan)

References

External links
 Official site
  (English: Ministry of Defense)

Afghanistan, Defence
Military of Afghanistan
Defence
Afghanistan
Ministries of the Islamic Republic of Afghanistan